Peter Hardy may refer to:

 Peter Hardy, Baron Hardy of Wath (1931–2003), British Labour Party politician
 Peter Hardy (actor) (1957–2023), Australian actor
 Peter Hardy (baseball executive) (1917–1997), Canadian brewer and baseball executive
 Peter Hardy (historian) (1922–2013), British academic